María Teresa Estevan Bolea (born 26 October 1936 Huesca) is a Spanish engineer and politician.  She was the first woman in the State Corps of Industrial Engineers , and the third woman in Spain to obtain the title of Industrial Engineer (in 1968). In 2018, she received the "Women in Engineering" global award, by the World Federation of Engineering Organizations (WFEO)

Life 

She graduated from the School of Industrial Engineering of Barcelona , where she specialized in welding and environmental engineering.

From 1968 to 1975, she worked in the General Directorate of Energy, beginning  the process of the construction of nuclear power plants in Spain.

She joined the People's Party; she was elected deputy for Madrid, in the 1986 and 1989 Spanish general elections . In 1994, she was elected to the European Parliament. 

From 2012 to 2016, she was Dean of the Official College of Industrial Engineers of Madrid.

References 

1936 births
Spanish engineers
Living people